Roghun District or Nohiyai Roghun is a former district in the Districts of Republican Subordination in Tajikistan, bordering on Faizobod District from the west, the Vahdat District from the north-west, and the Nurobod District from the north-east. Its southeastern border was with the Khatlon Region, running along the Vakhsh Range. Its capital was Roghun. Around 2018, the district was merged into the city of Roghun.

Administrative divisions
The district was divided administratively into jamoats. They were as follows (and population).

References

Former districts of Tajikistan